Rødovre station is a commuter rail railway station serving the suburbs of Rødovre and Hvidovre west of Copenhagen, Denmark. The station is located on the boundary between Rødovre and Hvidovre municipalities and serves parts of either. It is located on the Taastrup radial of Copenhagen's S-train network.

Unusual tracks
The station has a peculiar layout in that the outgoing (northern) track is elevated about 5 meters above the other tracks; passenger access facilities are located in rooms directly beneath the track, providing (almost) level access to the platform for the ingoing track from the bus terminal north of the station. Allegedly the idea behind this arrangement was that most passengers were traveling to/from Copenhagen, so departing passengers get easy access to their platform whereas upon arrival one merely has to descend the stairs. A new elevator was built in 2004.

The station was opened on 24 April 1964, ten years after the line was opened for S-trains.

See also
 List of railway stations in Denmark

References

External links

S-train (Copenhagen) stations
Railway stations opened in 1964
Railway stations in Denmark opened in the 20th century